The 1978 New York Yankees season was the 76th season for the Yankees. The team finished with a record of 100–63, finishing one game ahead of the Boston Red Sox to win their third American League East title. The two teams were tied after 162 games, leading to a one-game playoff, which the Yankees won. New York played home games at Yankee Stadium in The Bronx and was managed by Billy Martin, Dick Howser, and Bob Lemon.

In the best-of-five League Championship Series (ALCS), they defeated the Kansas City Royals in four games. In the World Series, they defeated the Los Angeles Dodgers in six games in a rematch of the previous year's.

The season was tumultuous for the Yankees, as Reggie Jackson was suspended in a mid-season showdown with Billy Martin, which resulted in Martin resigning a week later. For television viewers of the Bronx Bombers, it was the first season to be broadcast nationwide via satellite via WPIX, which that year became a superstation as well partly in response to Ted Turner's WTCG-TV nationwide broadcasts of the Atlanta Braves beginning on Opening Day of 1977. WPIX remained the team's exclusive broadcast partner for the Greater New York television viewers on FTA television and the by now superstation status and satellite broadcasts finally enabled millions all over the country to watch Yankees home and away games live as they happened.

Offseason 
 November 22, 1977: Goose Gossage was signed as a free agent by the Yankees.
 December 5, 1977: Jesús Figueroa was drafted from the Yankees by the Chicago Cubs in the 1977 rule 5 draft.
 December 9, 1977: Sergio Ferrer was traded by the Yankees to the New York Mets for Roy Staiger.
 December 12, 1977: Stan Thomas and Ed Ricks (minors) were traded by the Yankees to the Chicago White Sox for Jim Spencer, Tommy Cruz, and Bob Polinsky (minors).

Regular season 
Lefthander Ron Guidry was the last Yankee pitcher to win at least 25 games in a season in the 20th century. In 35 starts in the regular season (including the playoff game), he pitched  innings, compiled a 25–3 record with 248 strikeouts, 1.74 ERA, and nine shutouts. Guidry won the Cy Young Award by unanimous vote.

Relief pitcher Goose Gossage won Rolaids Relief Man of the Year Award, leading the American League with 27 saves.

Season summary 
A week after the All-Star Game in July, the team was fourteen games behind Boston, but rallied to tie for first place. With a week to go, New York led by one game and won six straight, but lost the finale at home to struggling Cleveland on Sunday, October 1, while Boston won their final eight games. The Yankees traveled to Fenway Park and defeated the Red Sox 5–4 in the one-game playoff for the AL East title; the Monday afternoon game featured light-hitting shortstop Bucky Dent's famous three-run go-ahead home run in the seventh inning. Jackson's solo home run in the eighth was the winning margin.

For decades, some have mistakenly thought the Yankees trailed by 14½ games, but the maximum deficit was fourteen games, after the July 17 loss and until the July 20 win. New York's biggest lead was 3½ games, after another victory over Boston on Saturday, September 16.

Game log 

|-style=background:#fbb
| 1 || April 8 || @ Rangers || 1–2 || Matlack (1–0) || Gossage (0–1) || || Arlington Stadium || 40,078 || 0–1
|-style=background:#bfb
| 2 || April 9 || @ Rangers || 7–1 || Figueroa (1–0) || Alexander (0–1) || || Arlington Stadium || 20,243 || 1–1
|-style=background:#fbb
| 3 || April 10 || @ Rangers || 2–5 || D. Ellis (1–0) || Tidrow (0–1) || Moret (1) || Arlington Stadium || 14,299 || 1–2
|-style=background:#fbb
| 4 || April 11 || @ Brewers || 6–9 || Augustine (2–0) || Hunter (0–1) || Caldwell (1) || County Stadium || 8,934 || 1–3
|-style=background:#fbb
| 5 || April 12 || @ Brewers || 3–5 || Haas (2–0) || Gossage (0–2) || || County Stadium || 8,751 || 1–4
|-style=background:#bfb
| 6 || April 13 || White Sox || 4–2 || Guidry (1–0) || Wood (0–2) || || Yankee Stadium || 44,667 || 2–4
|-style=background:#bfb
| 7 || April 15 || White Sox || 3–2 || Figueroa (2–0) || Barrios (0–1) || || Yankee Stadium || 20,965 || 3–4
|-style=background:#bfb
| 8 || April 16 || White Sox || 3–0 || Tidrow (1–1) || Kravec (1–1) || Lyle (1) || Yankee Stadium || 32,750 || 4–4
|-style=background:#fbb
| 9 || April 17 || Orioles || 1–6 || Flanagan (1–2) || Hunter (0–2) || || Yankee Stadium || 15,674 || 4–5
|-style=background:#bfb
| 10 || April 18 || Orioles || 4–3 || Lyle (1–0) || T. Martinez (0–1) || || Yankee Stadium || 15,628 || 5–5 
|-style=background:#fbb
| 11 || April 19 || @ Blue Jays || 3–4 || Murphy (1–0) || Gossage (0–3) || || Exhibition Stadium || 13,306 || 5–6
|-style=background:#fbb
| 12 || April 21 || Brewers || 2–9 || Augustine (3–1) || Figueroa (2–1) || || Yankee Stadium || 15,105 || 5–7
|-style=background:#bfb
| 13 || April 22 || Brewers || 4–3 (12) || Lyle (2–0) || McClure (0–1) || || Yankee Stadium || 17,594 || 6–7 
|-style=background:#fbb
| 14 || April 23 || Brewers || 2–3 || Sorensen (2–1) || Hunter (0–3) || McClure (0–1) || Yankee Stadium || 26,291 || 6–8
|-style=background:#bfb
| 15 || April 24 || @ Orioles || 8–2 || Guidry (2–0) || McGregor (0–3) || || Memorial Stadium || 18,053 || 7–8 
|-style=background:#bfb
| 16 || April 25 || @ Orioles || 4–3 || Beattie (1–0) || Palmer (2–1) || Lyle (2) || Memorial Stadium || 14,159 || 8–8
|-style=background:#bfb
| 17 || April 28 || @ Twins || 3–1 || Figueroa (3–1) || Thormodsgard (1–2) || || Metropolitan Stadium || 11,674 || 9–8
|-style=background:#fbb
| 18 || April 29 || @ Twins || 1–3 || Zahn (2–0) || Tidrow (1–2) || || Metropolitan Stadium || 10,543 || 9–9
|-style=background:#bfb
| 19 || April 30 || @ Twins || 3–2 || Gossage (1–3) || Scarce (0–1) || || Metropolitan Stadium || 13,929 || 10–9

|-style=background:#bfb
| 20 || May 1 || Royals || 8–4 || Eastwick (1–0) || Splittorff (4–2) || Lyle (3) || Yankee Stadium || 17,340 || 11–9
|-style=background:#bfb
| 21 || May 2 || Royals || 4–2 || Hunter (1–3) || Gura (2–1) || Lyle (4) || Yankee Stadium || 19,152 || 12–9
|-style=background:#bfb
| 22 || May 3 || Royals || 6–5 || Figueroa (4–1) || Leonard (3–4) || Gossage (1) || Yankee Stadium || 21,230 || 13–9
|-style=background:#bfb
| 23 || May 5 || Rangers || 5–2 || Guidry (3–0) || Matlack (2–4) || Gossage (2) || Yankee Stadium || 17,285 || 14–9
|-style=background:#fbb
| 24 || May 6 || Rangers || 5–9 || Umbarger (1–1) || Tidrow (1–3) || || Yankee Stadium || 19,788 || 14–10
|-style=background:#bfb
| 25 || May 7 || Rangers || 3–2 (12) || Gossage (2–3) || Barker (1–2) || || Yankee Stadium || 53,829 || 15–10
|-style=background:#bfb
| 26 || May 9 || Twins || 3–1 || Hunter (2–3) || Thormodsgard (1–4) || Lyle (5) || Yankee Stadium || 11,271 || 16–10
|-style=background:#fbb
| 27 || May 12 || @ Royals || 3–4 || Bird (2–2) || Gossage (2–4) || || Royals Stadium || 33,061 || 16–11
|-style=background:#bfb
| 28 || May 13 || @ Royals || 5–2 || Guidry (4–0) || Leonard (3–6) || Gossage (3) || Royals Stadium || 40,903 || 17–11
|-style=background:#fbb
| 29 || May 14 || @ Royals || 9–10 || Hrabosky (1–0) || Clay (0–1) || || Royals Stadium || 36,034 || 17–12
|-style=background:#bfb
| 30 || May 15 || @ White Sox || 4–1 || Beattie (2–0) || Wortham (1–2) || Lyle (6) || Comiskey Park || 17,569 || 18–12
|-style=background:#bfb
| 31 || May 16 || @ White Sox || 8–3 || Holtzman (1–0) || Wood (3–4) || Gossage (4) || Comiskey Park || 21,837 || 19–12
|-style=background:#fbb
| 32 || May 17 || @ Indians || 4–5 (10) || Monge (1–0) || Lyle (2–1) || || Cleveland Stadium || 10,370 || 19–13
|-style=background:#bfb
| 33 || May 18 || @ Indians || 5–3 || Guidry (5–0) || Kinney (0–2) || Gossage (5) || Cleveland Stadium || 13,625 || 20–13
|-style=background:#bfb
| 34 || May 19 || @ Blue Jays || 11–3 || Tidrow (2–3) || Jefferson (2–5) || || Exhibition Stadium || 26,025 || 21–13
|-style=background:#fbb
| 35 || May 20 || @ Blue Jays || 8–10 || Lemanczyk (1–7) || Clay (0–2) || || Exhibition Stadium || 30,550 || 21–14
|-style=background:#bfb
| 36 || May 21 || @ Blue Jays || 2–1 || Figueroa (5–1) || Underwood (1–4) || Gossage (6) || Exhibition Stadium || – || 22–14
|-style=background:#bfb
| 37 || May 21 || @ Blue Jays || 9–1 || Clay (1–2) || Garvin (2–2) || || Exhibition Stadium || 41,308 || 23–14
|-style=background:#bfb
| 38 || May 23 || Indians || 10–1 || Guidry (6–0) || Hood (3–2) || || Yankee Stadium || 20,618 || 24–14
|-style=background:#bfb
| 39 || May 25 || Indians || 9–3 || Tidrow (3–3) || Waits (3–4) || || Yankee Stadium || 15,403 || 25–14
|-style=background:#bfb
| 40 || May 26 || Blue Jays || 4–3 || Lyle (3–1) || Garvin (2–3) || || Yankee Stadium || 24,171 || 26–14
|-style=background:#fbb
| 41 || May 27 || Blue Jays || 1–4 || Clancy (3–4) || Figueroa (5–2) || Murphy (3) || Yankee Stadium || 56,078 || 26–15
|-style=background:#bfb
| 42 || May 28 || Blue Jays || 5–3 || Guidry (7–0) || Jefferson (3–6) || || Yankee Stadium || – || 27–15
|-style=background:#bfb
| 43 || May 28 || Blue Jays || 6–5 (13) || Gossage (3–4) || Murphy (2–1) || || Yankee Stadium || 41,534 || 28–15
|-style=background:#bfb
| 44 || May 29 || @ Indians || 2–0 || Eastwick (2–0) || Waits (3–5) || || Cleveland Stadium || 19,563 || 29–15
|-style=background:#fbb
| 45 || May 30 || @ Indians || 1–5 || Wise (3–8) || Tidrow (3–4) || || Cleveland Stadium || 6,069 || 29–16
|-style=background:#fbb
| 46 || May 31 || Orioles || 2–3 || Flanagan (6–4) || Figueroa (5–3) || || Yankee Stadium || 21,404 || 29–17

|-style=background:#fbb
| 47 || June 1 || Orioles || 0–1 || Palmer (7–4) || Beattie (2–1) || || Yankee Stadium || 19,943 || 29–18
|-style=background:#bfb
| 48 || June 2 || @ Athletics || 3–1 || Guidry (8–0) || Johnson (4–3) || Gossage (7) || Oakland Coliseum || 18,993 || 30–18
|-style=background:#fbb
| 49 || June 3 || @ Athletics || 1–5 || Keough (3–4) || Messersmith (0–1) || || Oakland Coliseum || 14,499 || 30–19
|-style=background:#fbb
| 50 || June 4 || @ Athletics || 4–6 || Lacey (5–2) || Eastwick (2–1) || Sosa (7) || Oakland Coliseum || 19,289 || 30–20
|-style=background:#fbb
| 51 || June 5 || @ Mariners || 3–7 || House (4–4) || Figueroa (5–4) || || Kingdome || 15,189 || 30–21
|-style=background:#fbb
| 52 || June 6 || @ Mariners || 3–4 || Rawley (3–5) || Gossage (3–5) || || Kingdome || 12,638 || 30–22
|-style=background:#bfb
| 53 || June 7 || @ Mariners || 9–1 || Guidry (9–0) || Colborn (1–4) || || Kingdome || 12,544 || 31–22
|-style=background:#bfb
| 54 || June 9 || @ Angels || 3–1 || Figueroa (6–4) || Tanana (9–3) || Gossage (8) || Anaheim Stadium || 29,415 || 32–22
|-style=background:#fbb
| 55 || June 10 || @ Angels || 3–4 (12) || LaRoche (5–2) || Gossage (3–6) || || Anaheim Stadium || 37,848 || 32–23
|-style=background:#fbb
| 56 || June 11 || @ Angels || 6–9 || D. Miller (2–0) || Clay (1–3) || || Anaheim Stadium || 31,646 || 32–24
|-style=background:#bfb
| 57 || June 12 || Athletics || 2–0 || Guidry (10–0) || Heaverlo (2–2) || || Yankee Stadium || 28,457 || 33–24
|-style=background:#bfb
| 58 || June 13 || Athletics || 5–3 || Figueroa (7–4) || Langford (1–3) || Gossage (9) || Yankee Stadium || 30,779 || 34–24
|-style=background:#bfb
| 59 || June 14 || Mariners || 11–9 (10) || Lyle (4–1) || Montague (0–2) || || Yankee Stadium || 18,015 || 35–24
|-style=background:#bfb
| 60 || June 15 || Mariners || 5–2 || Gullett (1–0) || Mitchell (2–7) || Lyle (7) || Yankee Stadium || 18,643 || 36–24
|-style=background:#fbb
| 61 || June 16 || Angels || 7–10 || Aase (3–3) || Beattie (2–2) || || Yankee Stadium || 35,968 || 36–25
|-style=background:#bfb
| 62 || June 17 || Angels || 4–0 || Guidry (11–0) || Hartzell (1–5) || || Yankee Stadium || 33,162 || 37–25
|-style=background:#fbb
| 63 || June 18 || Angels || 2–3 || Knapp (7–5) || Figueroa (7–5) || || Yankee Stadium || 55,604 || 37–26
|-style=background:#fbb
| 64 || June 19 || @ Red Sox || 4–10 || Burgmeier (2–1) || Gossage (3–7) || || Fenway Park || 33,163 || 37–27
|-style=background:#bfb
| 65 || June 20 || @ Red Sox || 10–4 || Gullett (2–0) || Torrez (10–3) || || Fenway Park || 32,643 || 38–27
|-style=background:#fbb
| 66 || June 21 || @ Red Sox || 2–9 || Eckersley (7–2) || Beattie (2–3) || || Fenway Park || 32,459 || 38–28
|-style=background:#bfb
| 67 || June 22 || @ Tigers || 4–2 || Guidry (12–0) || Rozema (2–4) || Gossage (10) || Tiger Stadium || 33,971 || 39–28
|-style=background:#bfb
| 68 || June 23 || @ Tigers || 12–3 || Lyle (5–1) || Wilcox (4–6) || || Tiger Stadium || 39,022 || 40–28
|-style=background:#fbb
| 69 || June 24 || @ Tigers || 3–4 || Slaton (7–4) || Tidrow (3–5) || || Tiger Stadium || 37,681 || 40–29
|-style=background:#bfb
| 70 || June 25 || @ Tigers || 4–2 || Gullett (3–0) || Baker (1–1) || Gossage (11) || Tiger Stadium || 34,014 || 41–29
|-style=background:#fbb
| 71 || June 26 || Red Sox || 1–4 || Eckersley (8–2) || Messersmith (0–2) || Campbell (3) || Yankee Stadium || 52,124 || 41–30
|-style=background:#bfb
| 72 || June 27 || Red Sox || 6–4 (14) || Lyle (6–1) || Drago (2–2) || || Yankee Stadium || 55,132 || 42–30
|-style=background:#fbb
| 73 || June 28 || @ Brewers || 0–5 || Caldwell (8–5) || Tidrow (3–6) || || County Stadium || – || 42–31
|-style=background:#fbb
| 74 || June 28 || @ Brewers || 2–7 || Augustine (9–8) || McCall (0–1) || || County Stadium || 39,283 || 42–32
|-style=background:#bfb
| 75 || June 30 || Tigers || 10–2 || Gullett (4–0) || Baker (1–2) || || Yankee Stadium || 33,894 || 43–32

|-style=background:#fbb
| 76 || July 1 || Tigers || 4–8 || Billingham (6–5) || Messersmith (0–3) || || Yankee Stadium || 37,260 || 43–33
|-style=background:#bfb
| 77 || July 2 || Tigers || 3–2 || Guidry (13–0) || Hiller (6–4) || Gossage (12) || Yankee Stadium || – || 44–33
|-style=background:#bfb
| 78 || July 2 || Tigers || 5–3 || Gossage (4–7) || Slaton (8–5) || || Yankee Stadium || 51,327 || 45–33
|-style=background:#fbb
| 79 || July 3 || @ Red Sox || 5–9 || Eckersley (9–2) || Figueroa (7–6) || || Fenway Park || 34,722 || 45–34
|-style=background:#fbb
| 80 || July 4 || @ Rangers || 2–3 || Matlack (7–8) || Gullett (4–1) || || Arlington Stadium || 37,702 || 45–35
|-style=background:#bfb
| 81 || July 5 || @ Rangers || 7–2 || Tidrow (4–6) || Medich (3–4) || || Arlington Stadium || 37,930 || 46–35
|-style=background:#fbb
| 82 || July 7 || @ Brewers || 0–6 || Caldwell (9–5) || Guidry (13–1) || || County Stadium || 40,216 || 46–36
|-style=background:#fbb
| 83 || July 8 || @ Brewers || 5–6 || Rodríguez (1–3) || Gossage (4–8) || McClure (4) || County Stadium || 46,518 || 46–37
|-style=background:#fbb
| 84 || July 9 || @ Brewers || 4–8 || Travers (5–4) || Gullett (4–2) || Stein (1) || County Stadium || 42,633 || 46–38
|-style=background:#bff
|colspan="10"|49th All-Star Game in San Diego, California
|-style=background:#fbb
| 85 || July 13 || White Sox || 1–6 || Wood (10–5) || Tidrow (4–7) || || Yankee Stadium || 28,532 || 46–39
|-style=background:#bfb
| 86 || July 14 || White Sox || 7–6 (11) || Gossage (5–8) || Hinton (1–3) || || Yankee Stadium || 21,981 || 47–39
|-style=background:#fbb
| 87 || July 15 || Royals || 2–8 || Leonard (10–11) || Figueroa (7–7) || || Yankee Stadium || 34,979 || 47–40
|-style=background:#fbb
| 88 || July 16 || Royals || 1–3 || Gura (7–2) || Beattie (2–4) || Hrabosky (13) || Yankee Stadium || 45,089 || 47–41
|-style=background:#fbb
| 89 || July 17 || Royals || 7–9 (11) || Hrabosky (3–3) || Gossage (5–9) || || Yankee Stadium || 27,020 || 47–42
|-style=background:#bfb
| 90 || July 19 || @ Twins || 2–0 || Figueroa (8–7) || Zahn (8–8) || || Metropolitan Stadium || 29,591 || 48–42
|-style=background:#bfb
| 91 || July 20 || @ Twins || 4–0 || Guidry (14–1) || Jackson (2–3) || || Metropolitan Stadium || 30,660 || 49–42
|-style=background:#bfb
| 92 || July 21 || @ White Sox || 7–4 || Lyle (7–1) || Hinton (1–4) || Gossage (13) || Comiskey Park || 30,348 || 50–42
|-style=background:#bfb
| 93 || July 22 || @ White Sox || 7–2 || Hunter (3–3) || Wood (10–7) || || Comiskey Park || 32,163 || 51–42
|-style=background:#bfb
| 94 || July 23 || @ White Sox || 3–1 || Figueroa (9–7) || Kravec (7–8) || Gossage (14) || Comiskey Park || 27,651 || 52–42
|-style=background:#fbb
| 95 || July 24 || @ Royals || 2–5 || Leonard (12–11) || Tidrow (4–8) || || Royals Stadium || 38,859 || 52–43
|-style=background:#bfb
| 96 || July 25 || @ Royals || 4–0 || Guidry (15–1) || Splittorff (11–9) || || Royals Stadium || 40,183 || 53–43
|-style=background:#bfb
| 97 || July 26 || Indians || 3–1 || Gossage (6–9) || Waits (7–11) || || Yankee Stadium || 31,631 || 54–43
|-style=background:#bfb
| 98 || July 27 || Indians || 11–0 || Figueroa (10–7) || Clyde (5–6) || || Yankee Stadium || – || 55–43
|-style=background:#fbb
| 99 || July 27 || Indians || 5–17 || Hood (5–4) || Hunter (3–4) || || Yankee Stadium || 33,412 || 55–44
|-style=background:#fbb
| 100 || July 28 || Twins || 5–7 (10) || Marshall (5–8) || Lyle (7–2) || || Yankee Stadium || 25,037 || 55–45
|-style=background:#bfb
| 101 || July 29 || Twins || 7–3 || Clay (2–3) || Jackson (3–4) || Gossage (15) || Yankee Stadium || 46,711 || 56–45
|-style=background:#bfb
| 102 || July 30 || Twins || 4–3 || Gossage (7–9) || Marshall (5–9) || || Yankee Stadium || – || 57–45
|-style=background:#fbb
| 103 || July 30 || Twins || 0–2 || Goltz (10–7) || Beattie (2–5) || Marshall (14) || Yankee Stadium || 41,491 || 57–46
|-style=background:#bfb
| 104 || July 31 || Rangers || 6–1 || Figueroa (11–7) || Medich (5–6) || || Yankee Stadium || 15,419 || 58–46

|-style=background:#bfb
| 105 || August 1 || Rangers || 8–1 || Hunter (4–4) || Matlack (8–9) || || Yankee Stadium || 18,485 || 59–46
|-style=background:#fbb
| 106 || August 2 || Red Sox || 5–7 (17) || Stanley (6–1) || Clay (2–4) || || Yankee Stadium || 52,701 || 59–47
|-style=background:#fbb
| 107 || August 3 || Red Sox || 1–8 (7) || Torrez (13–6) || Beattie (2–6) || || Yankee Stadium || 53,379 || 59–48
|-style=background:#fbb
| 108 || August 4 || Orioles || 1–2 || Flanagan (14–9) || Guidry (15–2) || Stanhouse (15) || Yankee Stadium || 28,189 || 59–49
|-style=background:#bfb
| 109 || August 5 || Orioles || 3–2 || Lyle (8–2) || T. Martinez (3–2) || || Yankee Stadium || 26,727 || 60–49
|-style=background:#bfb
| 110 || August 6 || Orioles || 3–0 || Hunter (5–4) || Palmer (13–10) || || Yankee Stadium || 40,765 || 61–49
|-style=background:#bfb
| 111 || August 8 || Brewers || 3–0 || Tidrow (5–8) || Caldwell (14–6) || Gossage (16) || Yankee Stadium || 22,549 || 62–49
|-style=background:#bfb
| 112 || August 9 || Brewers || 8–7 || McCall (1–1) || McClure (2–3) || || Yankee Stadium || 27,172 || 63–49
|-style=background:#bfb
| 113 || August 10 || Brewers || 9–0 || Guidry (16–2) || Augustine (10–11) || || Yankee Stadium || 35,127 || 64–49
|-style=background:#bfb
| 114 || August 11 || @ Orioles || 2–1 (6) || Hunter (6–4) || D. Martínez (8–10) || || Memorial Stadium || 29,539 || 65–49
|-style=background:#fbb
| 115 || August 12 || @ Orioles || 4–6 || Flanagan (15–10) || Beattie (2–7) || Stanhouse (17) || Memorial Stadium || 32,153 || 65–50
|-style=background:#fbb
| 116 || August 13 || @ Orioles || 0–3 (6) || McGregor (12–10) || Figueroa (11–8) || || Memorial Stadium || 31,591 || 65–51
|-style=background:#bfb
| 117 || August 14 || @ Orioles || 4–1 || Gossage (8–9) || Palmer (14–11) || || Memorial Stadium || 30,397 || 66–51
|-style=background:#bfb
| 118 || August 15 || @ Athletics || 6–0 || Guidry (17–2) || Langford (6–8) || || Oakland Coliseum || 13,862 || 67–51
|-style=background:#bfb
| 119 || August 16 || @ Athletics || 5–3 || Hunter (7–4) || Lacey (8–6) || Gossage (17) || Oakland Coliseum || 10,394 || 68–51
|-style=background:#bfb
| 120 || August 18 || @ Mariners || 6–1 || Figueroa (12–8) || Mitchell (6–12) || || Kingdome || 19,824 || 69–51
|-style=background:#fbb
| 121 || August 19 || @ Mariners || 1–4 || Colborn (4–8) || Tidrow (5–9) || || Kingdome || 29,915 || 69–52
|-style=background:#fbb
| 122 || August 20 || @ Mariners || 4–5 || Romo (10–4) || Gossage (8–10) || || Kingdome || 21,834 || 69–53
|-style=background:#bfb
| 123 || August 22 || @ Angels || 6–2 || Hunter (8–4) || Tanana (16–8) || || Anaheim Stadium || 35,644 || 70–53
|-style=background:#fbb
| 124 || August 23 || @ Angels || 3–6 || Knapp (13–7) || Figueroa (12–9) || LaRoche (18) || Anaheim Stadium || 33,472 || 70–54
|-style=background:#bfb
| 125 || August 25 || Athletics || 7–1 || Guidry (18–2) || Johnson (10–7) || || Yankee Stadium || 29,010 || 71–54
|-style=background:#bfb
| 126 || August 26 || Athletics || 5–4 || Lyle (9–2) || Lacey (8–8) || || Yankee Stadium || 53,883 || 72–54
|-style=background:#bfb
| 127 || August 27 || Athletics || 6–2 || Hunter (9–4) || Langford (6–10) || Gossage (18) || Yankee Stadium || 40,628 || 73–54
|-style=background:#bfb
| 128 || August 28 || Angels || 4–1 || Figueroa (13–9) || Tanana (16–9) || Gossage (19) || Yankee Stadium || 22,481 || 74–54
|-style=background:#bfb
| 129 || August 29 || Angels || 4–3 (11) || Gossage (9–10) || LaRoche (9–6) || || Yankee Stadium || 24,203 || 75–54
|-style=background:#bfb
| 130 || August 30 || @ Orioles || 5–4 || Guidry (19–2) || T. Martinez (3–3) || Gossage (20) || Memorial Stadium || 20,501 || 76–54
|-style=background:#bfb
| 131 || August 31 || @ Orioles || 6–2 || Tidrow (6–9) || McGregor (12–12) || Lyle (8) || Memorial Stadium || 15,579 || 77–54

|-style=background:#fbb
| 132 || September 1 || Mariners || 0–3 || Mitchell (7–13) || Hunter (9–5) || || Yankee Stadium || 20,167 || 77–55
|-style=background:#bfb
| 133 || September 2 || Mariners || 6–2 || Figueroa (14–9) || Colborn (4–10) || || Yankee Stadium || 18,530 || 78–55
|-style=background:#bfb
| 134 || September 3 || Mariners || 4–3 || Beattie (3–7) || Honeycutt (5–8) || Gossage (21) || Yankee Stadium || 22,386 || 79–55
|-style=background:#bfb
| 135 || September 4 || Tigers || 9–1 || Guidry (20–2) || Wilcox (12–9) || || Yankee Stadium || – || 80–55
|-style=background:#fbb
| 136 || September 4 || Tigers || 4–5 || Hiller (7–4) || Lyle (9–3) || || Yankee Stadium || 46,896 || 80–56
|-style=background:#bfb
| 137 || September 5 || Tigers || 4–2 || Tidrow (7–9) || Young (5–5) || Gossage (22) || Yankee Stadium || 16,891 || 81–56
|-style=background:#bfb
| 138 || September 6 || Tigers || 8–2 || Figueroa (15–9) || Billingham (15–7) || || Yankee Stadium || 24,452 || 82–56
|-style=background:#bfb
| 139 || September 7 || @ Red Sox || 15–3 || Clay (3–4) || Torrez (15–9) || || Fenway Park || 34,119 || 83–56
|-style=background:#bfb
| 140 || September 8 || @ Red Sox || 13–2 || Beattie (4–7) || Wright (8–3) || || Fenway Park || 33,134 || 84–56
|-style=background:#bfb
| 141 || September 9 || @ Red Sox || 7–0 || Guidry (21–2) || Eckersley (16–7) || || Fenway Park || 33,611 || 85–56
|-style=background:#bfb
| 142 || September 10 || @ Red Sox || 7–4 || Figueroa (16–9) || Sprowl (0–2) || Gossage (23) || Fenway Park || 32,786 || 86–56
|-style=background:#fbb
| 143 || September 12 || @ Tigers || 4–7 || Young (6–5) || Tidrow (7–10) || Hiller (13) || Tiger Stadium || 14,162 || 86–57
|-style=background:#bfb
| 144 || September 13 || @ Tigers || 7–3 || Beattie (5–7) || Billingham (15–8) || || Tiger Stadium || 16,841 || 87–57
|-style=background:#bfb
| 145 || September 14 || @ Tigers || 4–2 || Figueroa (17–9) || Slaton (15–11) || Lyle (9) || Tiger Stadium || 17,118 || 88–57
|-style=background:#bfb
| 146 || September 15 || Red Sox || 4–0 || Guidry (22–2) || Tiant (10–8) || || Yankee Stadium || 54,901 || 89–57
|-style=background:#bfb
| 147 || September 16 || Red Sox || 3–2 || Hunter (10–5) || Torrez (15–11) || || Yankee Stadium || 55,091 || 90–57
|-style=background:#fbb
| 148 || September 17 || Red Sox || 3–7 || Eckersley (17–8) || Beattie (5–8) || Stanley (9) || Yankee Stadium || 55,088 || 90–58
|-style=background:#bfb
| 149 || September 18 || Brewers || 4–3 || Figueroa (18–9) || Travers (10–11) || || Yankee Stadium || 20,557 || 91–58
|-style=background:#fbb
| 150 || September 19 || Brewers || 0–2 || Caldwell (20–9) || Tidrow (7–11) || || Yankee Stadium || 26,682 || 91–59
|-style=background:#fbb
| 151 || September 20 || @ Blue Jays || 1–8 || Willis (3–6) || Guidry (22–3) || || Exhibition Stadium || – || 91–60
|-style=background:#bfb
| 152 || September 20 || @ Blue Jays || 3–2 || Gossage (10–10) || Cruz (7–3) || || Exhibition Stadium || 38,080 || 92–60
|-style=background:#bfb
| 153 || September 21 || @ Blue Jays || 7–1 || Hunter (11–5) || Moore (6–8) || Gossage (24) || Exhibition Stadium || 28,653 || 93–60
|-style=background:#fbb
| 154 || September 22 || @ Indians || 7–8 (10) || Monge (4–3) || Gossage (10–11) || || Cleveland Stadium || 10,035 || 93–61
|-style=background:#fbb
| 155 || September 23 || @ Indians || 1–10 || Clyde (8–11) || Beattie (5–9) || || Cleveland Stadium || 17,452 || 93–62
|-style=background:#bfb
| 156 || September 24 || @ Indians || 4–0 || Guidry (23–3) || Paxton (12–10) || || Cleveland Stadium || 15,855 || 94–62
|-style=background:#bfb
| 157 || September 26 || Blue Jays || 4–1 || Figueroa (19–9) || Underwood (6–14) || Gossage (25) || Yankee Stadium || 20,535 || 95–62
|-style=background:#bfb
| 158 || September 27 || Blue Jays || 5–1 || Hunter (12–5) || Willis (3–7) || || Yankee Stadium || 20,052 || 96–62
|-style=background:#bfb
| 159 || September 28 || Blue Jays || 3–1 || Guidry (24–3) || Moore (6–9) || || Yankee Stadium || 30,480 || 97–62
|-style=background:#bfb
| 160 || September 29 || Indians || 3–1 || Beattie (6–9) || Kern (10–10) || Gossage (26) || Yankee Stadium || 30,253 || 98–62
|-style=background:#bfb
| 161 || September 30 || Indians || 7–0 || Figueroa (20–9) || Paxton (12–11) || || Yankee Stadium || 55,219 || 99–62

|-style=background:#fbb
| 162 || October 1 || Indians || 2–9 || Waits (13–15) || Hunter (12–6) || || Yankee Stadium || 39,189 || 99–63
|-style=background:#bfb
| 163 || October 2 || @ Red Sox || 5–4 || Guidry (25–3) || Torrez (16–13) || Gossage (27) || Fenway Park || 32,925 || 100–63

AL East tie-breaker game

Season standings

Record vs. opponents

Notable transactions 
 June 10: Ken Holtzman was traded by the Yankees to the Chicago Cubs for a player to be named later. Ron Davis was sent to the Yankees on June 12.
 June 14: Rawly Eastwick was traded by the Yankees to the Philadelphia Phillies for Bobby Brown and Jay Johnstone.
 June 15: Mickey Klutts, Dell Alston and $50,000 were traded by the Yankees to the Oakland Athletics for Gary Thomasson.

Draft picks 
 June 6: 1978 Major League Baseball draft
Rex Hudler was selected by the Yankees in the first round (18th pick), and he signed on June 20.
Steve Balboni was selected by the Yankees in the second round.

Roster

Notable events
Compounding the issue was the already-tumultuous relationship between Martin and Reggie Jackson, and Steinbrenner was pressuring him as well. With the score tied in the bottom of the tenth inning and Thurman Munson on first, Martin sent Jackson to the plate with orders to lay down a sacrifice bunt. Jackson tried to bunt the first pitch, but failed. Martin then relayed to third-base coach Dick Howser for Jackson to swing and Howser passed it on, but Jackson ignored Howser and attempted another bunt. Howser called time and talked with Jackson, but to no avail. On his final bunt attempt, Jackson fouled out to the catcher. Martin then removed Jackson from the game and suspended him (owner Steinbrenner limited it to five days, Tuesday through Saturday), but Kansas City won in eleven innings and swept the three-game series. Tuesday was an open date; the Yankees traveled to Minnesota and Jackson went to California.

Jackson returned to the team in Chicago on Sunday, July 23; he did not take batting practice and remained on the bench as the Yankees swept the White Sox for their fifth consecutive win. Martin commented in a post-game interview at the Chicago airport that (referring to Jackson and Steinbrenner, respectively) 'one's a born liar, and the other's convicted.'  The Steinbrenner reference was alluding to a past incident where the Yankee owner made illegal U.S. presidential campaign contributions.  The next day in Kansas City, Martin appeared on live television and tearfully announced his resignation as Yankees manager, but most sources believed he was actually fired by Steinbrenner for the "convicted" comment. Howser was acting manager for one game on July 24, a 5–2 loss at Kansas City on ABC's Monday Night Baseball, then Bob Lemon arrived as manager for the rest of the season.

In his first appearance since the bunting incident ten days earlier, Jackson started in right field on Thursday, July 27, and went three-for-three, with a home run, a walk, and three RBI. In the nightcap of the doubleheader, he had two hits.

During the Old-Timer's Day ceremony at Yankee Stadium on Saturday, July 29, Yankee public address announcer Bob Sheppard introduced Martin to the crowd and announced that Martin would return as manager for the 1980 season. Martin returned ahead of schedule, in June 1979, and was fired again four months later, after a fight in a Minnesota hotel. He went west to Oakland in 1980, then owned by Charlie O. Finley. Martin returned to the Yankees and managed the team in 1983, 1985, and 1988.

They won the division in a one-game playoff on the road, and went on to repeat as World Series champions.

On September 30, Ed Figueroa won his twentieth game of the season, which clinched a tie for the AL East  title. As of 2018, Figueroa is the only native of Puerto Rico to win twenty games in a major league season.

Player stats

Batting

Starters by position 
Note: Pos = Position; G = Games played; AB = At bats; H = Hits; Avg. = Batting average; HR = Home runs; RBI = Runs batted in

Other batters 
Note: G = Games played; AB = At bats; H = Hits; Avg. = Batting average; HR = Home runs; RBI = Runs batted in

Pitching

Starting pitchers 
Note: G = Games pitched; IP = Innings pitched; W = Wins; L = Losses; ERA = Earned run average; SO = Strikeouts

Other pitchers 
Note: G = Games pitched; IP = Innings pitched; W = Wins; L = Losses; ERA = Earned run average; SO = Strikeouts

Relief pitchers 
Note: G = Games pitched; W = Wins; L = Losses; SV = Saves; ERA = Earned run average; SO = Strikeouts

Postseason

Postseason game log

|-style=background:#bfb
| 1 || October 3 || @ Royals || Royals Stadium || 7−1 || Beattie (1−0) || Leonard (0−1) || Clay (1) || 41,143 || 1−0
|-style=background:#fbb
| 2 || October 4 || @ Royals || Royals Stadium || 4−10 || Gura (1−0) || Figueroa (0−1) || || 41,158 || 1−1
|-style=background:#bfb
| 3 || October 6 || Royals || Yankee Stadium || 6−5 || Gossage (1−0) || Bird (0−1) || || 55,445 || 2−1
|-style=background:#bfb
| 4 || October 7 || Royals || Yankee Stadium || 2−1 || Guidry (1−0) || Leonard (0−2) || Gossage (1) || 56,356 || 3−1

|-style=background:#fbb
| 1 || October 10 || @ Dodgers || Dodger Stadium || 5−11 || John (2−0) || Figueroa (0−2) || || 55,997 || 0−1
|-style=background:#fbb
| 2 || October 11 || @ Dodgers || Dodger Stadium || 3−4 || Hooton (1−0) || Hunter (0−1) || Welch (1) || 55,982 || 0−2
|-style=background:#bfb
| 3 || October 13 || Dodgers || Yankee Stadium || 5−1 || Guidry (2−0) || Sutton (0−2) || || 56,447 || 1−2
|-style=background:#bfb
| 4 || October 14 || Dodgers || Yankee Stadium || 4−3 (10) || Gossage (2−0) || Welch (1−1) || || 56,445 || 2−2
|-style=background:#bfb
| 5 || October 15 || Dodgers || Yankee Stadium || 12−2 || Beattie (2−0) || Hooton (1−1) || || 56,448 || 3−2
|-style=background:#bfb
| 6 || October 17 || @ Dodgers || Dodger Stadium || 7−2 || Hunter (1−1) || Sutton (0−3) || || 55,985 || 4−2

ALCS

Game 1 
October 3: Royals Stadium

Game 2 
October 4: Royals Stadium

Game 3 
October 6: Yankee Stadium

Game 4 
October 7: Yankee Stadium

World Series

Awards and honors 
 Gold Glove Awards
Chris Chambliss, first baseman
Graig Nettles, third baseman
 Bucky Dent, Babe Ruth Award
 Bucky Dent, World Series MVP
 Goose Gossage, Rolaids Relief Man of the Year Award
 Ron Guidry, AL Cy Young

Franchise records 
 Ron Guidry, Yankees single season record, most strikeouts in a season (248)

All-Stars 
All-Star Game
 Guidry, Gossage, Reggie Jackson, Thurman Munson, and Graig Nettles represented the Yankees.

Other team leaders 
 Stolen Bases – Willie Randolph, 36
 Walks – Willie Randolph, 82

Farm system 

LEAGUE CO-CHAMPION: Tacoma

Notes

References 
1978 New York Yankees at Baseball Reference
1978 World Series
1978 New York Yankees at Baseball Almanac

New York Yankees seasons
New York Yankees
New York Yankees
1970s in the Bronx
American League East champion seasons
American League champion seasons
World Series champion seasons